Murukkery is located in Viluppuram district, Tamil Nadu, India.  It is a small village in Tindivanam town, but a famous one around neighbouring villages.  The people in this village usually perform agriculture to survive.

Villages in Viluppuram district